Modular Naval Artillery Concept (MONARC) was a study of the German defence industry about mounting the turret of the PzH 2000 self-propelled howitzer on a naval ship of frigate size.

Description 
The size required above and below deck and the weight of this turret are not much different from  the OTO Melara 76mm gun system, the standard naval gun of the German Navy.  But to deal with the much greater recoil of the 155 mm artillery piece on such a  vessel, a flexible mount with damping elements had to be designed.

This mount and a PzH 2000's turret was fitted experimentally in December 2002 on the Type 124 Sachsen-class frigate Hamburg at the shipyards of HDW in Kiel, when she was still fitting out. In 2004 the fire-control system was tested with a PzH 2000 strapped onto the helicopter deck of Hessen, another Type 124 frigate. The feasibility of using even the unmodified PzH 2000 with unguided "dumb" rounds to attack naval targets had been proven previously by the Swedish Coastal Artillery with tests performed in May 1996.

The future F125 class frigate was intended to make use of this concept. While the intricate elastic mounting system handled the recoil adequately, adapting all of the PzH-2000's systems for the corrosive naval environment proved more difficult and more costly than expected and MONARC appears to have been removed from F125 plans. The F125 class will now mount the new developed Otobreda 127/64 naval gun, which has a range of more than 120 km when using guided Vulcano ammunition.

See also 

4.5-inch Mark 8 naval gun - considered for a programme to 'up-gun' to the 155mm gun of the AS90 in a similar role

References

External links 
 German 155mm/52 MONARC @ www.navweaps.com
 HDW-Videos @ Howaldtswerke, a video  showing parts of the 2002 test can be downloaded here.
 MONARC | Mounting a Pzh 2000 turret to a German Frigate @ www.geopolitiki.com

Naval guns of Germany
155 mm artillery